Warszewo may refer to:
Warszewo, Warmian-Masurian Voivodeship
Warszewo, Szczecin